The A14 highway is a highway in Lithuania (Magistralinis kelias). It connects Vilnus and Utena. The length of the road is 95.60 km.

A 6 km section north of Vilnius city limits is refurbished to 2+2 with at-grade junctions and traffic lights. Another 5 km section with turbo roundabouts up to junction with 108 road is planned to be refurbished in 2018 at the latest.

References 

Roads in Lithuania